is one of the eight major titles in Japanese professional shogi. The word Kisei means an excellent player of shogi or go and has been translated as "shogi saint" (棋 ki 'shogi player' + 聖 sei 'excellent person').

The Kisei tournament started in 1962. With the creation of the Kisei, there were five major title tournaments along with the Meijin, Tenth Dan (Ryūō), Ōshō, and Ōi titles. It was held twice a year until the year 1994. The challenger for Kisei title holder is determined by first, second, and final preliminary rounds. The player that wins three games out of five first in the championship will become the new Kisei title holder.

Lifetime Kisei 

The  title is awarded to a player who has won Kisei Championship five times. Active players may qualify for this title, but it is only officially awarded upon their retirement or death.

The following professionals have qualified for this title:

 Yasuharu Ōyama (deceased)
 Makoto Nakahara (retired)
 Kunio Yonenaga (deceased)
 Yoshiharu Habu (active)
 Yasumitsu Satō (active)

Winners

Records
 Most titles overall: Yasuharu Ōyama, Makoto Nakahara and Yoshiharu Habu, 16
 Most consecutive titles: Yoshiharu Habu, 10 in a row (2008-2017)

See also 
Shogi
Kisei (Go)

References

External links 
Japan Shogi Association : Kisei Tournament

 
Shogi tournaments